, (born Ehime Prefecture, 16 November 1964), is a former Japanese rugby union player. He played as lock.

Career
After his graduation from Waseda University, with which he played in the Japan Rugby University Championship, he moved to Suntory, where he played the National Rugby Company Championship until the end of his career, in 1996. He was capped for Japan in the match against Scotland, at Murrayfield, on 27 September 1986. Kurihara was also in the 1987 Rugby World Cup roster, where he played only in the match against England at Sydney, on 30 May 1987, earning 3 international caps for Japan.

Notes

External links

1964 births
Living people
Rugby union locks
Tokyo Sungoliath players
Sportspeople from Ehime Prefecture
Japanese rugby union players
Japan international rugby union players